Acrosemia is a genus of moths in the family Geometridae erected by Gottlieb August Wilhelm Herrich-Schäffer in 1855.

Species
Acrosemia vulpecularia Herrich-Schäffer, [1855]
Acrosemia dichorda Hampson, 1904

References

Ennominae
Geometridae genera